Peter Fairclough (1893–1963) was an English professional footballer who played as a left half in the Football League for Tranmere Rovers and Manchester City.

Personal life 
Fairclough was the younger brother of footballer Albert Fairclough. He served in the First World War.

Career statistics

References 

1893 births
1963 deaths
Association football forwards
Association football wing halves
British military personnel of World War I
Cammell Laird 1907 F.C. players
Eccles United F.C. players
English Football League players
English footballers
Footballers from St Helens, Merseyside
Manchester City F.C. players
St Helens Town A.F.C. players
Tranmere Rovers F.C. players